Zhanat Kuanyshevich Suleimenov (22 July 1962 – 10 January 2022) was a Kazakh military leader and politician. He served as Deputy Minister of Internal Affairs from 2017 to 2019. He committed suicide on 10 January 2022, at the age of 59, after a criminal case was opened against him during the 2022 Kazakh protests. He and many Kazakh politicians have been accused of treason during the unrest, including the former head of Kazakhstan's national security committee, Karim Masimov.

References

1962 births
2022 deaths
2022 suicides
Kazakhstani politicians
People from Karaganda Region
Suicides in Kazakhstan